Daniil Medvedev was the defending champion, but withdrew before his first match.

Alex de Minaur won his first ATP Tour title, defeating Andreas Seppi in the final, 7–5, 7–6(7–5).

Seeds
The top four seeds receive a bye into the second round.

Draw

Finals

Top half

Bottom half

Qualifying

Seeds

Qualifiers

Lucky losers

Qualifying draw

First qualifier

Second qualifier

Third qualifier

Fourth qualifier

References

External links
 Main Draw
 Qualifying Draw

Men's Singles